Kannad is a Taluka and a Municipal Council City in Aurangabad District in the Indian state of Maharashtra. Kannad has located 58 km from Aurangabad. It is located 24 km away from the Ellora Caves and Grishneshwar Temple. It is 45 Km from Daulatabad / Deogiri Fort. 
Kannad has the highest number of Dams in Maharashtra. 
It has 15 Dams and 7 Lakes. Kannad is in Marathwada.
Kannad has around 244 Villages. Kannad is also called as प्रवेश व्दार - Entry Gate for Marathwada and Khandesh Region. It joins Marathwada and Khandesh Region. 
Kannad is one of the developed Taluka in Aurangabad  District. 

Kannad also has one of the biggest Sugar Factory Baramati Agro Limited - Kannad Unit owned by Shri. Rajendra Pawar and Maharashtrian Politician and NCP MLA Rohit Rajendra Pawar.

Tourism
Pitalkhora Caves, Buddhist Rock-Cut Caves.
Gautala Autramghat Sanctuary, Protected Wildlife Sanctuary
Antur Fort - Built by Maratha Killedar.
Ambadi Dam, Shivna Takli Dam- Biggest Dams in Kannad
Malhargad - Khandoba Temple on the edge of Autram Ghat.

Geography
It has an average elevation of 633 metres (2076 feet).
Origin of Shivna River is from Kannad. Shivna River starts in Kannad and flows directly to Jaikwadi Dam.
Kannad has largest number of Teak and Sandalwood Trees.
Kannad has large villages including Hiwarkheda Gautala, Pishor, Bahirgaon, Chapaner, Andhaner, Nagad, Aurala, Kunjkheda, Karanjkheda, Nagapur, Chikalthana.
Agriculture is the main occupation in Kannad. Sugarcane, Onion, Ginger, Wheat, Maize and Jower are main crops cultured in Kannad Taluka.
Mumbai - Nagpur State Highway runs through Kannad.
Dhule - Solapur National Highway 211 runs through Kannad.
Navodaya Vidyalaya is also located in Kannad.

Demographics
 of India census, Kannad Taluka has total population of around 4,50,000. Kannad City has a population of 40,759. Males constitute 52% of the population and females 48%. Kannad has an average literacy rate of 84.45%, higher than the state average of 82.34%: male literacy is 90.44%, and female literacy is 78.07%. In Kannad, 15% of the population is under 6 years of age.

Schedule Caste (SC) constitutes 7.19% while Schedule Tribe (ST) were 3.78% of total population in Kannad.

Hinduism is practiced by 80% of the population. Muslims constitute 16% of the population. Navayana Buddhism is practiced by 3% of the population.

Kannad population are mostly of Maratha caste.

Politics
Kannad is part of the Aurangabad Lok Sabha constituency. It is represented in the Maharashtra state legislature through the Kannad (Vidhan Sabha Constituency).

References

Talukas in Maharashtra
Cities and towns in Aurangabad district, Maharashtra